General elections were held in Brazil on 5 October 2014 to elect the president, the National Congress, and state governorships. As no candidate in the presidential election received more than 50% of the vote in the first round on 5 October 2014, a second-round runoff was held on 26 October 2014.

Elections were held in the midst of the devastating 2014 Brazilian economic crisis. President Dilma Rousseff of the left-wing Workers' Party ran for reelection, choosing incumbent Vice President Michel Temer of the centre-right Brazilian Democratic Movement as her running-mate. During her first term, Rousseff's presidency was rocked by the 2013 protests in Brazil, initiated mainly by the Free Fare Movement, in response to social inequality in the country.

Aécio Neves, a Senator from the electorally crucial state of Minas Gerais, entered the race as the candidate of the centre-right Brazilian Social Democracy Party. Neves, who previously served as a popular Governor of Minas Gerais, had previously considered running for president in 2010 before ultimately declining. Unlike in past presidential elections, the PSDB ticket consisted of two members of the party, with party member and Senator from São Paulo Aloysio Nunes serving as his running mate.

Former Governor of Pernambuco Eduardo Campos, who had served with Rousseff in the left-wing Lula administration, entered the race as a centre-left alternative to Rousseff on the Brazilian Socialist Party (PSB) ticket. For his running mate, Campos chose Marina Silva, an environmentalist politician from the state of Acre who performed unexpectedly well in the 2010 presidential election. However, Campos unexpectedly died in a plane crash less than two months before the first round of voting, and Silva replaced him at the top of the ticket.

In the first round of voting, Dilma Rousseff won 41.6% of the vote, ahead of Aécio Neves with 33.6% and Marina Silva with 21.3%. Rousseff and Neves contested the runoff on 26 October, and Rousseff won re-election by a narrow margin, 51.6% to Neves' 48.4%, the closest margin for a Brazilian presidential election since 1989.

Presidential election
Incumbent President Dilma Rousseff of the Workers' Party (PT), Brazil's first female president, was challenged by 11 other candidates. Minas Gerais Senator Aécio Neves from the Brazilian Social Democracy Party (PSDB) and Marina Silva from the Brazilian Socialist Party (PSB) were her main rivals. Since none of the candidates obtained over 50% of the valid votes in the 5 October election, a second-round election was held on 26 October between Rousseff and Neves, who had finished first and second respectively in the 5 October vote.

In the run-up to the election, allies of 2010 PSDB presidential nominee José Serra pushed for Governor of São Paulo Geraldo Alckmin, who served as the party's nominee in 2006, to serve as the party's nominee versus Dilma. One of the people who pushed for Alckmin's nomination was Senator from São Paulo Aloysio Nunes, who was later chosen as the running-mate of Neves.

The original PSB candidate had been Eduardo Campos. However, he died in a plane crash in Santos on 13 August 2014, after which the party chose Silva, who had been his running mate, to replace him as the presidential candidate.

Conservative federal deputy Jair Bolsonaro had publicly declared his interest in running for either the presidency or vice presidency in the run-up to the election. However, Bolsonaro did not enter the race.

Aécio Neves running mate selection 
Six potential running mates were speculated on as potential vice presidential candidates to run with Aécio Neves on the PSDB ticket according to reporting done by O Globo.

 Aloysio Nunes, Senator from São Paulo (PSDB) - Selected
 Mara Gabrilli, federal deputy from São Paulo and deputy party chairwoman (PSDB)
 Fernando Henrique Cardoso, former President of Brazil (PSDB)
 José Agripino Maia, president of the Democrats, a party allied with the PSDB (DEM)
 Ellen Gracie Northfleet, former Justice of the Supreme Federal Court (non-partisan)
 Joaquim Barbosa, Justice of the Supreme Federal Court (non-partisan)

Campaign Issues

Economy

Dilma Rousseff 

Rousseff defended the significant economic gains and improvements in living standards during her administration and that of her predecessor, Lula da Silva.

Aécio Neves 
Neves proposed sweeping reductions in the welfare state and state intervention in the economy.

Allegations of corruption 
Shortly before the election, a former executive of the state-run oil company Petrobras accused a minister, three state governors, six senators and dozens of congressmen from President Dilma Rousseff's Workers’ Party (PT) and several coalition allies of having accepted kickback payments from contracts.

Candidates

Candidates in runoff

Candidates failing to make runoff

Debates

Opinion polls

First round

Second round

Results

President

Voter demographics

Chamber of Deputies

Senate

Aftermath
The small difference between the votes of both candidates, around 3.5 million, made this election to be the most disputed of Brazil since the redemocratization. Dilma was sworn in as 36th President of Brazil on 1 January 2015 in a ceremony conducted by Renan Calheiros in the floor of the Chamber of Deputies.

International reaction

Presidents and representatives of different countries saluted the victory of Dilma Rousseff on 26 October over Aécio Neves.

  - President of Argentina Cristina Kirchner used her social media to salute Dilma. In a letter directed to Dilma and published in her Facebook page, Kirchner celebrated the results of the election in Brazil which, according to her, "shows the Brazilian society reaffirming their unshakable commitment with a political project that guarantees economic growth with social inclusion". Also stated that the mutual cooperation between Brazil and Argentina would increase from this moment.
  - Bolivian president Evo Morales highlighted president Dilma's victory and stated that it "represents the model of change" in Brazil and in the Latin America. "Bolivia salutes the triumph of partner Dilma. We greet the continuity of the model of change in Brazil and the region", declared the leader in Shinahota, according to the state agency ABI.
  - Salvadoran president Salvador Sánchez Cerén congratulated Dilma for her victory through his Twitter account.
  - Ecuatorian president Rafael Correa celebrated, in his Twitter account, the "amazing victory of Dilma in Brazil". "We salute the president of Brazil, Dilma Rousseff, for her today's electoral victory", commented the Ecuatorial chancellor, Ricardo Patiño, also using the social network.
  - The French government greeted president Rousseff for her reelection. "France wishes to work in strict cooperation with the Brazilian government to boost the strategic partnership between both countries in all areas", declared the French Ministry of Foreign Affairs. The French government also remembered that the relationship with Brazil was centered in three priorities: reinforce the political dialogue about climate changes, increase commercial and investment connections, and dynamize the cooperation of university exchange programs.
  - German Chancellor Angela Merkel sent a telegram congratulating Dilma Rousseff for her reelection, expressing in text the possibility to keep the ties between both countries. "I congratulate you for the reelection as president of Brazil. I am glad that we can keep our political and economic cooperation. In face of the challenges that both nations are facing, only together and as partners, we can overcome them", stated Merkel.
  - Russian president Vladimir Putin also congratulated Dilma for her reelection and stated "the victory in the polls is a proof of the popular support for her politics". In his telegram, Putin expressed that "the results of the voting showed that the people supports Dilma Rousseff's politics and looks for the economic development of the country and the strengthening of its international positions". The Russian president also rated as very good the attention Dilma gives to the "strengthening of the Russian-Brazilian strategic association".
  - American president Barack Obama congratulated Dilma and requested that the ties with Brazil should be strengthened, which, according to Obama, it was "an important ally of the United States". The American president also expressed interest to schedule a meeting to discuss the possibility to "reinforce the collaboration for the world security and the respect to human rights, as well as deepen the bilateral cooperation in areas like education, energy and, mostly, trade".
  - Venezuelan president Nicolás Maduro highlighted Dilma's victory in his official Twitter account, shortly after the announce of the first results. "Victory of Dilma in Brazil. Victory of the People. Victory of Lula and his legacy. Victory of the people of Latin America and Caribbean", stated in his account.

Besides chiefs of state, the international press also reverberated Dilma's victory. The New York Times in the United States highlighted the reelection on the front page of the newspaper and states that the victory "endosses a leftist leader who has achieved important gains in reducing poverty and keeping unemployment low"; Argentine El Clarín highlighted on the front page that Dilma won by a narrow margin "at the end of a tough campaign, full of denounced and mutual accusations"; for the United Kingdom Financial Times, "Dilma now faces the task of uniting a country divided by the most aggressive campaign of recent times, to resurrect a creeping economy and pacify hostile markets"; Venezuelan El Universal highlighted on its first page Aécio Neves' reaction, who acknowledged his defeated and highlighted in his speech that "the priority now is to unite Brazil"; French Le Monde mentioned the defeat in São Paulo, main electoral college of the country, but "compensated by the victory in Minas Gerais, the second largest electoral college and Aécio Neves' political fief"; Spanish El País brings as a highlight an article signed by journalist Juan Arais, from Rio de Janeiro, entitled "The political change in Brazil will have to wait".

Crisis

From 2014 and on, right after the results of the elections, an economic crisis began in Brazil, having as a consequence the strong economic recession, succeeded by a retreat of the Gross Domestic Product (GDP) for 2 consecutive years. The economy reduced in around 3.8% in 2015 and 3.6% in 2016. The crisis also brought a high level of unemployment, which reached its peak in March 2017, with a rate of 13.7%, representing more than 14 million Brazilians unemployed.

In 2016, the effects of the economic crisis were widely felt by the population, who needed to adapt their bills to the financial reality. According to a research made by the Industry National Confederation (CNI) in that year, almost half of the interviewed (48%) began to use more public transportation and 34% don't have a health insurance anymore. The deepening of the crisis made 14% of the families to change their children's schools, from private to public, with a percentage higher than the one verified in 2012 and 2013, before the crisis. Besides that, consumers change products to the cheaper ones (78%), waited for sales to buy higher value goods (80%) and saved more money for emergencies (78%).

In the first quarter of 2017, GDP rose 1%, being the first growth after 8 consecutive quarter drops. Minister of Finance Henrique Meirelles said that, in that moment, the country "left the largest recession of the century".

Yet in 2014 also began a political crisis. The match of this crisis happened on 17 March 2014, when the Federal Police of Brazil began a series of investigations and would be known as Operation Car Wash, initially investigating a corruption scheme and money laundry of billions of reais involving many politicians of the largest parties of the country. The operation had direct impact in the country politics, contributing for the impopularity of Dilma's administration, just as, posteriorly, for Temer's administration, as long as many of their ministers and allies were targeted of the operation, such as Geddel Vieira Lima and Romero Jucá. The operation is still ongoing with 51 operational phases and splits.

The protests against Dilma Rousseff government, due to the results of Operation Car Wash, occurred in many regions of Brazil, having as one of the main goals the impeachment of the president. The movement brought together millions of people on 15 March, 12 April, 16 August and 13 December 2015 and, according to some estimates, were the largest popular mobilizations in the country. The protest of 13 March 2016 was considered the largest political act in the history of Brazil and occurred over all the country, overcoming also Diretas Já, which occurred during the transition period from the Military Dictatorship to the redemocratization.

Rousseff's impeachment

On 2 December 2015, president of Chamber of Deputies, Eduardo Cunha, accepted one of the seven impeachment requests against Dilma, which was registered by jurists Hélio Bicudo, Miguel Reale Júnior and Janaína Paschoal, and delivered to Cunha 2 months before. In the original request, were included denounces of decrees signed by the president in 2015, to release R$ 2.5 billions (US$  billion), without Congress approval, nor prevision on budget. This operation is known as fiscal pedaling (Pedalada fiscal), and it's characterized as administrative misconduct.

The acceptance of the impeachment request was considered by part of the press as a retaliation against the president's party, which deputies announced on that same day that they would vote against Cunha in the Chamber's Ethics Committee, where he was investigated for a supposed participation in the scheme denounced in Operation Car Wash. Cunha denied any "bargain" relation with the government, stating that "the decision to accept the impeachment is factual, is concrete, has clear tipification", but kept attributing to president Rousseff responsibilities about the investigations against him. According to Luiz Inácio Lula da Silva, Dilma didn't have "the will of doing politics" and didn't have any meeting with party caucuses to try to repeal the impeachment.

Due to the parliamentary recess and the sues filed in the Supreme Federal Court with the objective to decide formally the rite of the process only on 17 March 2016, the Chamber elected, with open voting, the 65 members of the Special Committee which analyzed the impeachment request against Dilma Rousseff. There were 433 votes in favor of the committee membership and 1 against. On 11 April, the Special Committee, with 38 votes in favor and 27 against, approved the report, which defended the admissibility of the process. The report, made by deputy Jovair Arantes (PTB-GO), went for voting in the floor of the Chamber. On 17 April 2016, a Sunday, the Chamber of Deputies, with 367 votes in favor, 137 against, besides 7 abstentions and 2 absences, impeached Rousseff and authorized the Federal Senate to install the process against the president.

On 6 May 2016, the Senate Impeachment Special Committee approved, with 15 votes in favor and 5 against, the report of senator Antônio Anastasia (PSDB-MG), in favor of the impeachment. On 11 May, Justice Teori Zavascki denied a government request to null the process. With the decision, the Senate kept the voting that would decide the suspension of Rousseff from office.

On 12 May 2016, with 55 favorable votes, 22 contrary and 2 absences, the Federal Senate authorized the opening of the impeachment process, and determined her suspension from the Presidency of the Republic for up to 180 days. On 31 August, the Federal Senate, with a voting of 61 to 20, removed Rousseff from office of President, but kept her political rights. With the impeachment, Michel Temer, who was Vice President of Brazil and Acting President until that moment, took office as president until the end of the term.

See also

References 

General elections in Brazil
Brazil
Gen
October 2014 events in South America